Ərəb Qubalı (also, Ərəbqubalı, Arab-Kubali, Arabkubaly, Kubali, and Kubalikend) is a village and municipality in the Kurdamir Rayon of Azerbaijan.

References 

Populated places in Kurdamir District